Mean Girls is a 2004 American teen comedy film directed by Mark Waters, written by Tina Fey, and starring Lindsay Lohan, Rachel McAdams, Lacey Chabert, Amanda Seyfried (in her film debut), Tim Meadows, Ana Gasteyer, Amy Poehler and Fey. The supporting cast includes Lizzy Caplan, Jonathan Bennett, Daniel Franzese and Neil Flynn. The screenplay is based in part on Rosalind Wiseman's 2002 book Queen Bees and Wannabes, which describes female high school social cliques, school bullying and the damaging effect they can have on teenagers. Fey also drew from her own experience at Upper Darby High School as an inspiration for some of the concepts in the film. The plot centers on a naïve teenage girl navigating her way through the social hierarchy of a modern American high school after years of her parents homeschooling her while conducting research in Africa.

Saturday Night Live creator Lorne Michaels produced the film. Fey was a long-term cast member and writer for Saturday Night Live. Although set in the Chicago suburb of Evanston, Illinois, the film was mostly shot in Toronto, Canada. Filming took place from September to November 2003. The film marks Lohan's second collaboration with director Waters, the first being Freaky Friday, released a year earlier.

Released on April 30, 2004, Mean Girls grossed $130 million worldwide and developed a cult following. Critics praised Waters' direction, Fey's screenplay, its humor and the performances; especially lauded was Lohan's acting, which earned several accolades including three Teen Choice Awards and three MTV Movie Awards, and in 2021, was listed as the eleventh-best performance of the 21st century by The New Yorker. The made-for-TV sequel Mean Girls 2, premiered on ABC Family on January 23, 2011. A musical adaptation premiered on Broadway in March 2018.

Plot 

Sixteen-year-old homeschooled Cady Heron and her parents return to the United States after twelve years in Africa, settling in Evanston, Illinois. After an intimidating first day at North Shore High School, Cady befriends outsiders Janis Ian and Damian Leigh, who explain the school's various cliques and warn her to avoid the "Plastics", a group consisting of wealthy but insecure Gretchen Wieners, sweet but dimwitted Karen Smith, and "queen bee" Regina George. When Cady is invited to sit with the Plastics at lunch, Janis persuades her to infiltrate the ruling clique.

Cady becomes attracted to Aaron Samuels, a senior in her calculus class and Regina's ex-boyfriend, and learns about the "Burn Book", a scrapbook the Plastics fill with cruel rumors about students and faculty. Regina offers to talk to Aaron on Cady's behalf, but instead kisses him in front of her and resumes their relationship. Feeling betrayed, Cady fully commits to Janis' plan to damage Regina's reputation. Regina tells Cady that she and Janis were once friends until she accused Janis of being a lesbian and ostracized her.

After their attempts to sabotage Regina's wardrobe backfire, Cady, Janis, and Damian plan to turn Gretchen against her. They make it seem as though Regina has sent "candy cane-grams" to Cady and Karen while excluding Gretchen. Regina further humiliates Gretchen during their dance performance at the Winter Talent Show, leading Gretchen to tell Cady all of Regina's embarrassing secrets. Cady informs Aaron that Regina is cheating on him, prompting them to break up, and tricks Regina into eating nutrition bars that cause her to gain weight. Following a sharp drop in Regina's reputation, she is replaced by Cady as the new "queen bee".

Cady throws a house party while her parents are away, and drunkenly admits to Aaron that she has been deliberately failing math class to make him help her, but he rebukes her for becoming as manipulative and image-obsessed as Regina. Janis and Damian confront Cady for lying to them about the party and remaking herself in Regina's image. Cady accuses Janis of being in love with her, and Janis declares her a "mean girl" and renounces their friendship.

Realizing Cady's betrayal, Regina retaliates by distributing the contents of the Burn Book throughout school, inciting chaos among the girls of the junior class. She avoids suspicion by inserting insults about herself, and blame is placed on Cady, Gretchen, and Karen. To restore order, Principal Duvall and math teacher Ms. Norbury gather the female junior students in the gym to apologize to each other. Regina insults Janis' sexuality, prompting Janis to reveal her entire plan to destroy Regina's reputation as the students cheer. Regina storms out, pursued by an apologetic Cady, and is struck by a school bus, fracturing her spine.

When Ms. Norbury is investigated as a drug dealer due to comments Cady wrote in the burn book, Cady takes full blame for the book. She is shunned by her peers and distrusted by her own parents, but gradually returns to her old self. She joins the school Mathletes at the state finals, answering the tiebreaker correctly and winning the championship. The team arrives at the Spring Fling dance, where Cady is elected queen, but declares that all her classmates are wonderful in their own way, snapping the plastic tiara and distributing the pieces to other girls in the crowd, including Janis, Gretchen, and Regina. She rekindles her friendship with Janis and Damian, makes up with Aaron, and reaches a truce with the Plastics.

The Plastics disband at the beginning of the new school year; Regina joins the lacrosse team to positively manage her anger. Karen becomes the school weather reporter, and Gretchen joins the "Cool Asians" clique. Aaron graduates and attends Northwestern University while starting a relationship with Cady. Reflecting on the relative social peace that has taken over North Shore High, Cady notices a trio of new "Junior Plastics" in Freshman year, and imagines them being hit by a bus.

Cast 
 Lindsay Lohan as Cady Heron, a 16-year-old girl who transfers to a public high school after being homeschooled her whole life in Africa and Aaron Samuels' love interest.
 Jessie Wright as 5-year-old Cady.
 Rachel McAdams as Regina George, a rich, popular mean girl. Regina is Janis' ex-best friend, current rival and leader of The Plastics.
 Lacey Chabert as Gretchen Wieners, an insecure rich girl and a member of the Plastics who only wants Regina's acceptance.
 Amanda Seyfried as Karen Smith, a ditsy but sweet member of the Plastics and Gretchen's best friend.
 Lizzy Caplan as Janis Ian, an artistic, rebellious goth who befriends Cady and hatches a plan to take down Regina. Janis is Damian's best friend and Regina's ex-best friend and current rival.
 Daniel Franzese as Damian Leigh, Janis' gay best friend who is very flamboyant.
 Jonathan Bennett as Aaron Samuels, a Senior on the Football, Soccer and Swim teams, Regina's ex-boyfriend, and Cady's love interest.
 Rajiv Surendra as Kevin Gnapoor, the "hormonal Mathletes president" who is attracted to Janis.
 Tina Fey as Ms. Sharon Norbury, the school Math teacher, whom the Burn Book defames as a drug dealer.
 Tim Meadows as Principal Ron Duvall, the principal of North Shore High School.
 Amy Poehler as June George, Regina and Kylie's irresponsible mother.
 Ana Gasteyer as Betsy Heron, Cady's mother.
 Neil Flynn as Chip Heron, Cady's father.
 Daniel DeSanto as Jason, Gretchen's unfaithful boyfriend.
 Diego Klattenhoff as Shane Oman, a football player who has an on-and-off relationship with Regina.
 Alisha Morrison as Lea Edwards.
 Julia Chantrey as Amber D'Alessio, a victim of the Burn Book.
 Molly Shanahan as Kristen Hadley, an athletic girl on the Lacrosse team.
 Jan Caruana as Emma Gerber.
 Jacky Chamberlain as Giselle Sigro.
 Olympia Lukis as Jessica Lopez.
 Dwayne Hill as Coach Carr, the school's physical education teacher whom the Burn Book exposes as a sex offender.
 Jonathan Malen as Kristen's boyfriend.
 Nicole Crimi as Kylie George, Regina's younger sister.
 Dan Willmott as Mr. George, Regina and Kylie's wealthy father.
 Laura de Carteret as Taylor Wedell's Mom

Production

Development 

Tina Fey read Rosalind Wiseman's Queen Bees and Wannabes and called Saturday Night Live producer Lorne Michaels to suggest it could be turned into a film. Michaels contacted Paramount Pictures, who purchased the rights to the book. As the book is nonfiction, Fey wrote the plot from scratch, borrowing elements from her own high school experience and her impressions of Evanston Township High School, upon which the film's fictional "North Shore High School" is based.

Fey named many characters after real life friends. In a 2014 interview about the movie, she told Entertainment Weekly, "I tried to use real names in writing because it's just easier." Main character Cady Heron was named after Fey's college roommate Cady Garey. Damian was named after Fey's high school friend Damian Holbrook, who went on to become a writer for TV Guide. Minor character Glenn Coco is named after a friend of Fey's older brother; the real Glenn Coco works as a film editor in Los Angeles. Janis Ian was named after singer Janis Ian, who was one of the musical guests on the first Saturday Night Live episode, in which she sang the song "At Seventeen", which can be heard playing in the background when the girls are fighting at Regina's house.

Casting 
Lindsay Lohan first read for Regina George, but the casting team felt she was closer to what they were looking for in the actress who played Cady, and since Lohan feared the "mean girl" role would harm her reputation, she agreed to play the lead. Rachel McAdams was cast as Regina because Fey felt McAdams being "kind and polite" made her perfect for such an evil-spirited character. Amanda Seyfried also read for Regina, and the producers instead suggested her for Karen due to Seyfried's "spacey and daffy sense of humor". Both Lacey Chabert and Daniel Franzese were the last actors tested for their roles. Lizzy Caplan was at first considered too pretty for the part of Janis, for which director Mark Waters felt a "Kelly Osbourne-like actress" was necessary, but Caplan was picked for being able to portray raw emotion. Fey wrote two roles based on fellow SNL alumni, Amy Poehler (whom Fey thought the producers would not accept because of being too young to portray a teenager's mother) and Tim Meadows, and the cast ended up with a fourth veteran of the show, Ana Gasteyer. Evan Rachel Wood was offered a role in the film, but turned it down. Blake Lively did final tests for the role of Karen Smith but the producers decided to keep looking. Ashley Tisdale also auditioned for Gretchen Wieners. Mary Elizabeth Winstead was asked to audition for the role of Gretchen Wieners, but her mom declined as she disliked the script. Jonathan Bennett was a last-minute cast replacement after the actor originally slated to play Aaron Samuels got fired. James Franco had previously been considered for that role as well. Fey's decision to hire Bennett was due to his resemblance to her longtime SNL co-star Jimmy Fallon.

Filming 
Although set in Evanston, Illinois, the film was mostly shot in Toronto, Ontario, at Etobicoke Collegiate Institute and Malvern Collegiate Institute, as well as at Montclair High School in Montclair, New Jersey. Landmarks include the University of Toronto's Convocation Hall and Sherway Gardens. Principal photography commenced on September 27, and concluded on November 25, 2003.

Soundtrack 

Mean Girls: Music from the Motion Picture was released by Rykodisc and Bulletproof Records on September 21, 2004, the same day as the DVD release.

 "Dancing with Myself" by the Donnas (Generation X cover)
 "God Is a DJ" by Pink
 "Milkshake" by Kelis
 "Sorry (Don't Ask Me)" by All Too Much
 "Built This Way" by Samantha Ronson
 "Rip Her to Shreds" by Boomkat (Blondie cover)
 "Overdrive" by Katy Rose
 "One Way or Another" by Blondie
 "Operate" by Peaches
 "Misty Canyon" by Anjali Bhatia
 "Mean Gurl" by Gina Rene and Gabriel Rene
 "Hated" by Nikki Cleary
 "Psyché Rock", by Pierre Henry (Fatboy Slim Malpaso mix)
 "The Mathlete Rap" by Rajiv Surendra

Songs heard in the film but not on the soundtrack include the single "Pass That Dutch" by Missy Elliott, "Naughty Girl" by Beyoncé, "Beautiful" by Christina Aguilera, "Fire" by Joe Budden featuring Busta Rhymes, "At Seventeen" by Janis Ian, and "Halcyon + On + On" by Orbital, "Put 'Em Up" by N.O.R.E featuring Pharrell Williams, "Oh Yeah" / "Run" by Gabriel Rene and "Love's Theme" by the Love Unlimited Orchestra and "Jingle Bell Rock".

Rolfe Kent wrote the film's orchestral score, which was orchestrated by Tony Blondal. The score features taiko drums and a full orchestra.

Home media 
Mean Girls was released on VHS and DVD in North America on September 21, 2004, five months after it opened in theaters. It was released in a widescreen special collector's edition and a fullscreen collector's edition, both including several deleted scenes, a blooper reel, three T.V. spots, the theatrical trailer, previews and three featurettes. A Blu-ray version of the film was released on April 14, 2009. The film was later re-released on a 15th anniversary Blu-Ray in 2019. A limited SteelBook edition of the film was released in September 2022.

Reception

Box-office 
In its opening weekend, Mean Girls grossed $24.4 million from 3,159 screens at 2,839 theaters in the United States, ranking number one at the box office and averaging $8,606 per venue. The film closed on September 9, 2004, grossing $86.1 million domestically and $43 million internationally for a total worldwide gross of $129 million. Paramount said the audience was 75% female, and 50% was under the age of 18. Over 90% of moviegoers rated the picture either "excellent" or "very good", and positive notices remained strong even outside the target demographic; ratings were over 80% positive from men in their thirties.

Critical response 

Mean Girls received largely positive reviews; critics lauded Lohan's and McAdams' performances and labeled the film as Seyfried's and Caplan's breakthrough roles. Review aggregation website Rotten Tomatoes gives the film an approval rating of 84% based on 190 reviews, with an average rating of 7.00/10. The site's critical consensus states: "Elevated by a brilliant screenplay and outstanding ensemble cast, Mean Girls finds fresh, female-fronted humor in the high school experience." On Metacritic, the film has a score of 66 out of 100, based on 39 critics, indicating "generally favorable reviews". Audiences polled by CinemaScore, gave the film an average grade of "A−" on an A+ to F scale.

Roger Ebert of the Chicago Sun-Times gave the film three stars out of four, writing: "In a wasteland of dumb movies about teenagers, Mean Girls is a smart and funny one." Ann Hornaday of The Washington Post wrote that it "boasts a one-two-three punch in star Lindsay Lohan, screenwriter Tina Fey and director Mark Waters, and, indeed, it delivers a knockout". The screenplay was highly praised by critics with Peter Travers of Rolling Stone calling it "comic gold". Entertainment Weekly put it on its end-of-the-decade "best-of" list, saying: Fetch' may never happen, but 2004's eminently quotable movie is still one of the sharpest high school satires ever. Which is pretty grool, if you ask me!" In 2006, Entertainment Weekly had also named it the 12th-best high school film of all time: "While Mean Girls is technically a comedy, its depiction of girl-on-girl cattiness stings incredibly true." In 2012, Rotten Tomatoes included the film in its "Top 50 Greatest Teen Comedies" list. In 2021, Marie Claire ranked Mean Girls as the best 2000s movie, calling it "the '00s pop culture staple".

In March 2021, Richard Brody of The New Yorker ranked Lohan's performance in the film as the eleventh best of the 21st century up to that point, praising her "blend of charisma and awkwardness, innocence and guile" as well as "faux-casual earnestness" she used for dialogue. In 2022, Rolling Stone ranked Mean Girls as the twentieth greatest comedy of the 21st century, saying: "Tina Fey established herself as one of America's best comedy writers courtesy of this instant teen-movie classic, which boasts one of the most quotable scripts of the past 20 years", while Indie Wire ranked it as the fifteenth best comedy of the 21st century, calling the script "effortlessly funny, but what makes the film truly timeless has more to do with the actors' ability to find the human grace notes amid the absurd high school hijinks (Kälteen Bars, anyone?) and instant-classic one-liners ("That's so fetch"). It's a high school comedy with broad genre humor and specific insight into teenage anxieties, and for that it stands the test of time." In October 2022, The Independent also included Lohan's role in a list of "outstanding performances", stating that she "gives a pretty flawless performance, dexterously balancing the film's irreverent comic tone with moments of occasional pathos."

Cultural impact 
Mean Girls has become a pop culture phenomenon. Fans have made GIFs and memes of the film and posted them on social media, including Facebook, Twitter and Tumblr. It is considered one of the most quotable movies of all time. In an interview about the film, Fey noted: "Adults find it funny. They are the ones who are laughing. Young people watch it like a reality show. It's much too close to their real experiences so they are not exactly guffawing." October 3rd has been dubbed "Mean Girls Day" on social media, alluding to a line by Cady, the protagonist. People also celebrate by wearing pink based on a line by Karen, another character. Clothing designers have printed quotes and other iconic imagery from the movie onto clothing and other merchandise.

Members of the cast have reunited in video over the years on that day for various causes. In 2017, they created a GoFundMe to raise money for the victims of the Las Vegas shooting and the National Compassion Fund. In 2019, they teamed up with the Thirst Project to raise money to fund a freshwater well in Uganda. In 2020, the cast was honored with the Pioneering Spirit Award for their #MeanGirlsDoGood campaign. On October 3, 2020, Katie Couric moderated a virtual cast reunion to reminisce about the film. Organized in collaboration with HeadCount to promote voting in the 2020 United States presidential election, it was the first time the entire cast gathered since the 2004 premiere.

American singer-songwriter Mariah Carey has said several times that she is a fan of the film, quoting the film in numerous interviews and TV appearances, including a 2013 episode of American Idol. Carey's 2009 single, "Obsessed", begins with an interlude quote where she says, "And I was like, 'Why are you so obsessed with me?, a line of Regina George's. Carey's ex-husband, Nick Cannon, revealed that the song was inspired by the film. In September 2020, Fey quizzed Carey about the movie to prove how much of a "superfan" she is on Billboard's Quizzed video series. Meanwhile the British band Wet Leg quotes the film ("Is your muffin buttered?/Would you like us to assign someone to butter your muffin?") in their song "Chaise Longue" (2021).

In August 2013, the White House tweeted a photo of President Obama's dog, Bo, holding a tennis ball and captioning: "Bo, stop trying to make fetch happen". Taco Bell made a reply to the White House, also using one of the quotes from the film. In June 2018, the official Twitter account of the Israeli Embassy in the U.S. made headlines when it responded to a tweet by Iranian leader Ali Khamenei, calling Israel "a malignant cancerous tumor", with an animated GIF of the "Why are you so obsessed with me?" quote from Mean Girls. In March 2019, Hillary Clinton tweeted a GIF of the same quote which went viral for being considered a response to Donald Trump. At the 2013 People's Choice Awards, Jennifer Lawrence referenced the film in her speech when she won Favorite Movie Actress. Multiple scenes from the movie have been reenacted and parodied by various celebrities throughout the years following its release, including Ed Sheeran, Iggy Azalea, Amber Rose and Waka Flocka Flame during a 2014 skit for MTV.

In June 2020, Irish Taoiseach Leo Varadkar referenced the movie during a COVID-19 lockdown news briefing. Varadkar stated that "some have asked whether there is a limit to what we can achieve", before drawing upon a line from the movie: "My answer is that the limit does not exist." Lord Of The Rings and The Goonies actor, Sean Astin, who played Samwise Gamgee in the Lord of the Rings trilogy, bet the Irish leader "50 quid" to quote Mean Girls in his next speech.

The sixth episode of the third season of How to Get Away with Murder included several references to the film, including Aja Naomi King's character Michaela Pratt using the line "you can't sit with us", Viola Davis' character Annalise Keating eating her lunch in a toilet cubicle after feeling like an outcast, Karla Souza's character Laurel Castillo using sweatpants on a Monday and Behzad Dabu's character Simon Drake calling several other students "mean girls". In June 2021, actress Aimee Lou Wood mentioned the film scene where Cady broke her Spring Fling crown in pieces and shared it with girls around her. She said: "Now, I said that I'd break [this award] into pieces and share it with everyone, It's solid, Daisy [Haggard], It's solid! So I'll give you a metaphorical piece to everyone in my category, especially Emma Mackey who's the best scene partner and best friend…" The third novel by American author Karen M. McManus, 'Two Can Keep A Secret' includes a reference to a line in the film, where the character Ezra refers to his school's prom committee as looking like "they wear pink on Wednesdays".

Accolades 
The film won and was nominated for a number of awards throughout 2004–2005.

Legacy

Works inspired by Mean Girls 
A novel based on the film, by author Micol Ostow, was released in September 2017 by Scholastic. Jonathan Bennett, who portrayed Aaron Samuels, released a cookbook inspired by the movie in 2018 called "The Burn Cookbook: Real Recipes to Feed Your Inner Plastic." The following year, he teamed up with Nocking Point Wines to release a limited rosé wine edition inspired by the film. Ariana Grande parodied the film in the music video for her 2018 song "Thank U, Next". The actors Jonathan Bennett and Stefanie Drummond, who were originally part of the film's cast, appeared in the video. A clip of Cady Heron from the movie was featured in a 2020 Discover Card commercial which aired during the Super Bowl LIV. K-pop singer Sunmi named her song “You Can't Sit with Us" after a quote from the movie.

A comic book sequel to the film, titled Mean Girls: Senior Year, was written by Arianna Irwin and released by Insight Comics in September 2020. A Mean Girls-themed pop-up restaurant in Santa Monica called Fetch was announced in 2020 as well. Primark launched a loungewear range inspired by the film in October 2019. On October 3, 2020, the Young Veterans Brewing Company released a Mean Girls-themed beer called "Army Pants & Flip Flops". Several Mean Girls-themed events, merchandising products and screenings have been often organized and produced in homage to the film.

In August 2020, Screen Junkies released a Honest Trailers episode on the film calling it "the best thing to come out of that era," with Screen Rant's Daniel Gillespie saying: "Mean Girls remains entertaining, funny, and, most importantly, accurate. [...] That relevance almost two decades later proves that Mean Girls is deserving of its classic status," and Slashfilm's Ethan Anderton writing that the "generation-defining high school movie" not only captures the teenage culture of the early 2000s perfectly, "but it's also hilariously clever for being adapted from a non-fiction parenting advice book [...] Mean Girls is great because it captures that cruel teen vibe perfectly, and it tries to deliver a nice wholesome message to fight it, which kids will laugh at, agree with, and then never do anything about." In September 2020, the Pillsbury Company released a limited edition of Toaster Strudel featuring pink icing and Mean Girls packaging to pay homage to its movie-claimed inventor's daughter, Gretchen Wieners.

Adaptations 
Video games

A game for PC was released in 2009 featuring characters specifically created for the game. In 2010, a Mean Girls video game developed by Crush Digital Media and planned to be published by 505 Games for the Nintendo DS handheld game console was announced, but was canceled before release. The DS game was nearly completed before cancellation and was found in 2021 by YouTuber Ray Mona (also known as Raven Simone), who got a file for the game in her email by an anonymous person. A full playthrough was uploaded to her channel on July 15, 2021. In 2015, an iOS game based on the film was released. Since 2015, Pocket Gems' mobile app Episode also released various Mean Girls interactive stories following the characters from the film due to "overwhelming fan response".

Stage musical

On January 28, 2013, Fey confirmed that a musical adaptation of Mean Girls was in the works. Fey wrote the book of the show, 30 Rock composer and Fey's husband Jeff Richmond worked on the music, and Casey Nicholaw directed. Paramount was also involved. The musical premiered at the National Theatre in Washington, D.C. on October 31, 2017. Mean Girls opened on Broadway at the August Wilson Theatre, with previews beginning March 12, 2018, and opening on April 8, 2018. On January 23, 2020, Tina Fey announced that a film adaptation of the Mean Girls musical was in active development. "I'm very excited to bring Mean Girls back to the big screen. It's been incredibly gratifying to see how much the movie and the musical have meant to audiences. I've spent sixteen years with these characters now. They are my Marvel Universe and I love them dearly," Fey said. During the film's cast reunion on October 3, 2020, Fey shared that fans could be involved in casting actors for the new adaptation by sharing their dream cast on the project's website and be featured in the musical film's "burn book".

Sequel 
A made-for-television sequel Mean Girls 2 premiered on ABC Family (now Freeform) on January 23, 2011, then subsequently released on DVD February 1. The plot takes place after the first movie and it has entirely different cast members, with the exception of Tim Meadows, who reprises his role as Principal Ron Duvall. Mean Girls 2 is directed by Melanie Mayron and stars Meaghan Martin and Jennifer Stone.

Future

Mean Moms 

In early 2014, Warner Bros. Pictures and New Line Cinema announced a planned release date of May 8, 2015, for a proposed spin-off of Mean Girls, adapted from another book penned by Rosalind Wiseman. However, in May 2014, New Line Cinema pulled the film from its proposed release date of May 2015; there is no release date for the spin-off.

Potential sequel 
In late September 2014, discussions arose that Lohan had pitched an idea to Fey for a sequel. Later that year, Lohan, along with other cast members of the original film, asked Fey to write a screenplay for it. The idea was brought up during a 10th anniversary for the film in Entertainment Weekly, with Fey declaring she regretted not doing a sequel closer to its original release: "At the time we did want to start the conversation about the sequel, and for whatever reason I was like, 'No!!! We shouldn't do that!' Now I look back and I'm like, 'Why?' But now, no—it's too late now." Seyfried had previously said she was "really willing to pursue" a sequel and was unsure why it had not happened. In December 2016, Lohan mentioned she was still trying to pitch a sequel, with the hopes of Jamie Lee Curtis and Jimmy Fallon appearing in the film. She said she knew Fey, Michaels and Paramount were busy, declaring: "I will keep forcing it and pushing it on them until we do it." In October 2018, Seyfried said people needed to start a campaign for it to finally come into fruition. In January 2019, Lohan was interviewed by Howard Stern who wondered whether the sequel would ever happen. Lohan repeated her interest in revisiting the role and confirmed she had spoken to Fey about it, also saying sequel plans were not currently in the works, "I think they can't do it right now. I've spoken to her [Tina], but it can't happen without her and all of the cast. [...] Sometimes you're like, 'It's just too soon to do it.' But it's been 15 years." In October 2019, Chabert was asked if a sequel would be happening to which she replied: "I don't know. I wish I had an answer for you, I feel like you need to start a petition," while saying she would "of course" revisit the character if given the chance as "it would be so much fun to revisit these women and see where they are now."

In April 2020, Lohan was once again asked about the sequel by David Spade and confessed she had been hanging on to the idea of coming back to doing movies with that project "for a really long time" but that it was out of her hands. "To work with Tina [Fey], and the whole crew again, and Mark Waters. That was really what I wanted. I was excited to do that. But that's all in their hands really," she concluded. A few days later, McAdams also expressed interest in reprising her role in a sequel, after having declared in previous years she would be up for it as long as Fey was on board, "She's our master-in-chief on this one. So, if she's into it, then I'm into it." Bennett then reacted to his co-stars by saying, "I was extremely excited when I heard Rachel [McAdams] say she'd love to play Regina George again because I've talked to over half the cast, including Lindsay [Lohan], and we all feel the same way", continuing, "We'd love to bring these beloved characters back to life at some point, whether it be sequel or a TV series. I think the world would love to see these characters again."

In an August 2020 interview on the podcast Unspooled, director Mark Waters discussed an idea for a sequel where the main characters from the original movie would now be young mothers serving together in a parent–teacher association, adding that its development is entirely up to Fey wanting to write a screenplay. A possible sequel was also questioned by Katie Couric while moderating a virtual reunion with the film's cast on October 3, 2020. Bennett then said in an interview he thought the virtual reunion "opened the door" for a sequel. In August 2022, Franzese talked about a potential sequel or reboot, "I would absolutely love it. And I would do it in any form whatsoever. This movie brings people so much joy. [...] I mean, I want to do a whole movie with the whole cast. We all play different characters. People would love that, you know? Tina Fey's got that power and she ain't pulling the trigger. So I don't know who else could do it." He revealed he was writing his own script and would try to pitch it to Fey as they approached the film's 20th anniversary, "I've been trying to write something now that has all of us in it [...] I think that within a year I could pitch it. And you know, it'll be fun. We're approaching the 20th anniversary, what a great time to start something like that."

References

External links 

 
 
 
 
 
 
 
 Ann Hornaday, "The 34 best political movies ever made" The Washington Post (Jan. 23, 2020), ranked number 8

Mean Girls (franchise)
2004 films
2004 comedy films
2004 LGBT-related films
2000s American films
2000s buddy comedy films
2000s female buddy films
2000s coming-of-age comedy films
2000s English-language films
2000s high school films
2000s teen comedy films
American buddy comedy films
American female buddy films
American coming-of-age comedy films
American films about revenge
American high school films
American teen comedy films
American teen LGBT-related films
Film and television memes
Films about narcissism
Films about school bullying
Films about teenagers
Films based on non-fiction books
Films directed by Mark Waters
Films produced by Lorne Michaels
Films scored by Rolfe Kent
Films set in 2003
Films set in 2004
Films set in Illinois
Films shot in New Jersey
Films shot in Toronto
Films with screenplays by Tina Fey
LGBT-related comedy films
Paramount Pictures films